Mahovlich is a surname. Notable people with the surname include:

Frank Mahovlich (born 1938), Canadian ice hockey player and politician, brother of Peter
Mike Mahovlich (born 1960), Canadian javelin thrower
Peter Mahovlich (born 1946), Canadian ice hockey player, coach, and executive